Mabel Lake Provincial Park is a provincial park in the Monashee Mountains of British Columbia, Canada, located on the east side of Mabel Lake, which is part of the Shuswap River system.  Created on December 21, 1972, at approximately 182 hectares, the park was expanded in 2000 to approximately 187 hectares.

References

BC Parks infopage

Monashee Mountains
Provincial parks of British Columbia
Provincial parks in the Okanagan
1972 establishments in British Columbia
Protected areas established in 1972